Zoosafari Fasanolandia is an animal attraction and theme park in Fasano in southern Italy.  The park includes a drive-through safari park in the visitor's own vehicle as well as walk around animal areas, animal shows, and several rides. The park opened in 1973 and includes the only male African elephant in Italy.

Location
The park is located in the town of Fasano in the province of Brindisi, Apulia, in southern Italy. It is on a Mediterranean hillside overlooking the sea.

Animal Exhibits

Safari Park: This is the main animal reserve at the park.  Visitors drive through in their own vehicle and observe wildlife from all over the globe roaming freely. When first entering the park, mouflon, fallow deer, red deer, barbary sheep, bongo, sitatunga, and water buffalo can be seen. After passing through the gates, a large pride of African lions can be viewed by visitors. Tigers and Asian black bears are also present. After leaving the large carnivores behind, macaques can be seen playing and climbing in trees. African and Asian elephants are seen later on with giraffe, American bison, eland and Arabian Oryx, donkeys, waterbuck, gnu, zebra, llama, ostrich, emu, horses and ponies, Ankole cattle, yak, and camels. The safari reserves end with the large lake of pink flamingos, cranes, storks, ibises, and peacocks.

Tropical Room:  After exiting the reserves, a number of reserves can be viewed on foot, the first of which is the tropical room.  Alligators and terrapins can be seen in a large tank, and many snakes, lizards, and tortoises can be seen as well.  Several amphibians can also be seen along with many fish.

Pedonal Zoological Trail: A special train can be ridden around this reserve, giving visitors the chance to see the animals more clearly.  Gorillas, chimpanzees, gibbons, and lemurs are some of the primate species present, while leopards and black panthers also make themselves at home. Capybara, raccoons, and African hunting dogs are also seen occasionally.

Lake of the Large Mammals: A number of species can be observed here. Seals and sea lions swim in the lake, while on land brown bears, polar bears, hippopotamus, and a duo of white rhinos can be seen.

Ornithological Exhibit: A number of tropical birds can be seen here including macaws, several birds of prey, and parrots.

Penguin House: A large group of penguins can be seen swimming and playing in their pool.

Dolphinarium: Several Bottle-nosed dolphins.

Theme park
As well as animals, the park has several rides: a log flume, roller coasters, ghost trains, and dodgem cars. One of the roller coasters, named Eurofighter, has a 97 degree drop.

Animal Shows
Several species at the park provide performances for the visitors at various times each day. Penguins and sea lions perform together and parrot shows are also available to see. Dolphin shows are incredibly popular with visitors due to the fact that not many parks keep dolphins or let them perform.

See also
Eurofighter (Zoosafari Fasanolandia)

References

External links

Animal theme parks
Safari parks
Zoos in Italy
Fasano
Tourist attractions in Apulia
Zoos established in 1973
Amusement parks opened in 1973
1973 establishments in Italy